DXTE-TV (channel 21) is a television station in Cagayan de Oro, Philippines, airing programming from the TV5 network. It is owned and operated by the network's namesake corporate parent through its licensee ABC Development Corporation; TV5 also provides certain services to One Sports outlet DXCO-TV (channel 29) under an airtime lease agreement with owner Nation Broadcasting Corporation. Both stations share transmitter facilities at the SMART Compound, Macapagal Drive, Upper Bulua, Cagayan de Oro City (near ABS-CBN).

Expansion
TV5 Cagayan de Oro has additional upcoming relay stations in Caraga, Lanao del Norte and Misamis Occidental, which made an expansion throughout Northern Mindanao. These are Malaybalay (Channel 34), Marawi (Channel 10), Oroquieta (Channel 47), Butuan (Channel 36), Iligan (Channel 32), Ozamiz (Channel 30), Surigao City (Channel 19), Tandag (Channel 24) and (Channel 29) San Francisco, Agusan del Sur but they are soon to be upgraded or installed in the future. Channels 13 Butuan, 8 Tandag and 10 San Francisco, Agusan del Sur are the former TV5 affiliate stations which are owned by PEC Broadcasting Corporation.

History
1968 - ABC Cagayan de Oro was first aired on Channel 10 (DXCC-TV), the first broadcast in the whole Northern Mindanao was launched by Associated Broadcasting Corporation President of the Philippines Ferdinand Marcos declared Martial Law was forced to shut-down in 1972.
1992 - ABC Cagayan de Oro was launched with the newly established DXHB-TV Channel 8 as an affiliate of Radio Mindanao Network, which RMN's first television station went on the air in the city.
July 8, 1993 - ABC Cagayan de Oro was launched under the ownership of Associated Broadcasting Company, which reopened its TV station ABC Channel 21 Cagayan de Oro, with its studio and transmitter tower in E.V. Marcoso Bldg. in Corrales Ave., Cagayan de Oro. It's different callsign as DXTE-TV and switched its frequency from VHF Channel 10 to UHF Channel 8.
December 9, 1994 - ABC TV stations acquired a new franchise to operate under Republic Act 7831 signed by President Fidel V. Ramos. In the same year, the station went on nationwide satellite broadcasting. In a phenomenal growth, ABC Cagayan de Oro earned its reputation as "The Fastest Growing Network" under new network executive Tina Monzon-Palma who served as Chief Operating Officer.
1996 - ABC Cagayan de Oro switched its frequency from VHF Channel 8 to UHF Channel 21.
August 8, 2008 - The station aired a countdown to its re-launch for much of the next day until 19:00 PHT, when the network officially re-launched under its new name of TV5.
October 2014 - TV5 Cagayan de Oro moved its studio from E.V. Marcoso Bldg. in Corrales Ave. to its current home at the SMART Compound in Macapagal Drive.
February 17, 2018 - as the recent changes within the network and in celebration of its 10th anniversary, TV5 Cagayan de Oro was relaunched as the 5 Network with a new logo and station ID entitled Get It on 5 whereas the TV on the northeastern quadrant of the logo has been dropped, making it more flexible for the other divisions to use it as part of their own identity.
January 13, 2019 - 5 Cagayan de Oro introduced a variation of the current numerical 5 logo, similar to the newly network, 5 Plus.
August 15, 2020 - 5 Cagayan de Oro was reverted to TV5 while retaining the 2019 numerical 5 logo.
July 24, 2021 - TV5 Cagayan de Oro started conducting digital test broadcast transmissions on UHF Channel 18.

Digital television

Digital channels

Areas of coverage

Primary areas  
 Cagayan de Oro
 Misamis Oriental

Secondary areas 
 Camiguin
 Portion of Bukidnon

See also
TV5
List of television and radio stations owned by TV5 Network
Radyo5 101.5 True FM Cagayan de Oro

References

Television stations in Cagayan de Oro
TV5 (Philippine TV network) stations
Television channels and stations established in 1993
Digital television stations in the Philippines